The Percival Lakes form a string of "S" shaped ephemeral salt lakes in the north of Western Australia. They lie at the southern region of the Great Sandy Desert and east of Karlamilyi National Park. The Canning Stock Route runs in close proximity to some of the lakes, and crosses the salt pan of Tobin Lake near the eastern end. The lakes were named during the aerial expedition of Donald George Mackay in 1933, after the designer of the Percival Gull aircraft being used.

See also
 Edgar Percival

References

Saline lakes of Western Australia
Lakes of the Pilbara (Western Australia)